The following is a timeline of the history of the city of Manaus, in Amazonas state, Brazil.

Prior to 20th century

 1669 - Fort of São José da Barra do Rio Negro built.
 1833 -  convenes in the former Fábrica Imperial.
 1848 - Manaus elevated to the category of city.
 1850 - Town becomes capital of Amazonas province.
 1856 - Town renamed "Manaus."
 1871 - Associação Comercial do Amazonas established.
 1872 - Population: 29,334.
 1878 - Metropolitan Cathedral of Manaus is inaugurated.
 1883 - Mercado Adolpho Lisboa built.
 1892 - Catholic Diocese of Amazonas established.
 1896
 Amazon Theatre opens.
 Electric lighting introduced.
 1900 - Population: 73,647.

20th century

 1904 -  newspaper begins publication.
 1910 - Free University School of Manaus established.
 1913 - Nacional Futebol Clube formed.
 1917 - Instituto Geográfico e Histórico do Amazonas founded.
 1920 - Population: 179,263.
 1930 - Nacional Fast Clube (football team) formed.
 1939 - América Futebol Clube formed.
 1949 -  newspaper begins publication.
 1961 - Estádio Ismael Benigno (stadium) opens.
 1967 - Free Economic Zone of Manaus established.
 1970
 Manaus Air Force Base begins operating.
 Vivaldão stadium opens.
 Population: 284,118.
 1974 -  neighborhood established.
 1976 - Eduardo Gomes International Airport opens.
 1980 - Population: 922,477.
 1989
 Park of Mindu established.
 Arthur Virgílio Neto becomes mayor.
 1991 - Population: 1,010,544.
 1996 - Festival Amazonas de Ópera begins.
 1997
 Amazonas Philharmonic founded.
 Alfredo Nascimento becomes mayor.
 2000 - Population: 1,347,590.

21st century

 2005 - Park of Bilhares established.
 2010 - Population: 1,802,014.
 2011 - Rio Negro Bridge opens.
 2012 - 7 October:  held.
 2013 - 2013 protests in Brazil.
 2014 - Arena da Amazônia opens.
 2016 - 2 October:  held.
 2017 - Prison riot at Anisio Jobim Penitentiary Complex .

See also
 Manaus history
 
 List of mayors of Manaus
 Amazonas history (state)

References

This article incorporates information from the Portuguese Wikipedia.

Bibliography

in English

in Portuguese

External links

Manaus
Manaus